Apaturina is a monotypic genus of butterflies in the family Nymphalidae.  Its sole species is Apaturina erminea, the turquoise emperor.

Description
The uppersides of the forewings are black with an iridescent blue-green base, two white small spots at the apex and a diagonal series of pale yellow patches across each wing. The uppersides of the hindwings are completely iridescent blue green in males, or chestnut brown in females, with an eyespot on each wing. The undersides are quite similar but the basic color is grayish brown, without iridescence.

Food and behavior
The adults feed on various liquids, from rotting fruits and sap. The caterpillars feed on Celtis latifolia (Ulmaceae). Males are very fast flyers, but settle for long periods in trees, where they perch head down and wings closed, more than 7 m from the ground.

Distribution
This species can be found in Indonesia (Aru Islands, Irian Jaya, Maluku), Papua New Guinea, Solomon Islands up to northern Australia. In Australia it is limited to lowland tropical rainforest in the Iron Range.

Subspecies
 Apaturina erminea erminea (Cramer, 1779) (Ambon, Serang)
 Apaturina erminea papuana (Ribbe, 1886) (Papua New Guinea)
 Apaturina erminea mirona Fruhstorfer, 1904 (Buru)
 Apaturina erminea erinna Fruhstorfer, 1904 (Obi)
 Apaturina erminea aluna Fruhstorfer, 1904 (Alu)
 Apaturina erminea ribbei Röber, 1894 (Bachan, Halmahera)
 Apaturina erminea octavia Fruhstorfer, 1904 (Waigeu)
 Apaturina erminea antonia Fruhstorfer, 1904 (Papua New Guinea)
 Apaturina erminea xanthocera Rothschild, 1904 (Solomon Islands)
 Apaturina erminea neopommerania Hagen, 1879 (Bismarck Archipelago)

Gallery

References

  1995: A new subspecies of Apaturina erminea from Morotai Island, Indonesia (Lepidoptera: Nymphalidae). Futao 19: 1-2.
 , 1998: A new subspecies of Apaturina erminea (Cramer, 1779) from New Ireland, Papua New Guinea (Lepidoptera : Nymphalidae). Futao 27: 1-3.

External links
Genus Apaturina at Markku Savela's Lepidoptera and Some Other Life Forms
 Biolib
 Australia faunal directory
 Don Herbison-Evans and Stella Crossley Apaturinae

Apaturinae
Taxa named by Gottlieb August Wilhelm Herrich-Schäffer
Monotypic butterfly genera
Nymphalidae genera